Alan Stuart Veingrad (born July 24, 1963) is a former American football offensive lineman in the National Football League. Veingrad played for the Green Bay Packers for five seasons, and for the Dallas Cowboys for two season, winning Super Bowl XXVII with the team over the Buffalo Bills. In his career he played a total of 86 games.

Early and personal life
Veingrad was born in Brooklyn, New York, lived in Englishtown, New Jersey, from ages three to nine, before moving to Miami, Florida, in 1972. He is Jewish, attended Hebrew school and was bar mitzvah, and grew up in a Jewish household.

He attended Miami Sunset High School. There, he competed in football and was captain of his high school team as well as All-Conference and All-American, and in track and field in discus and  shot put.

He married in 1993. Veingrad lived in Fort Lauderdale, Florida, and lives in Boca Raton, Florida, where he works for AIPAC to advocate for Israel.

College career
Veingrad received a scholarship from East Texas State University (now Texas A&M University–Commerce), in Commerce, Texas, to play college football and throw the discus. He was converted to an offensive lineman in football, and in 1984 he was named Lone Star All-Conference, Lone Star Offensive Lineman of the Year and received Division II and National Strength & Conditioning All-American honors. The six-foot, five-inch Veingrad worked out extensively and ate a high-carbohydrate diet, resulting in by the end of his freshman year weighing 220 pounds, and by the end of his college career weighing 270 pounds. He ultimately earned his degree. He was inducted into the school's Athletic Hall of Fame in October 2006.

Professional career
Veingrad was considered small for his position, and wasn't selected in the 1985 NFL Draft. Although he was selected by the San Antonio Gunslingers in the eleventh round (163rd overall) of the 1985 USFL Draft, he opted to sign as an undrafted free agent with the Tampa Bay Buccaneers. He was cut after 10 days.

The Houston Oilers claimed him off waivers, but eventually released him before the start of the 1985 season.

In 1986 he signed with the Green Bay Packers as a free agent, and became the opening day starter at right offensive tackle. He sat out all of the 1988 season with a career-threatening hip injury. His return and consistent play kept heralded rookie Tony Mandarich on the bench in 1989. In 1991, after four seasons as a starter for the Packers, he signed in Plan B free agency with the Dallas Cowboys, where as a backup at tackle and guard, he helped Emmitt Smith win the NFL rushing title in 1991 and 1992. He also helped the Cowboys reach Super Bowl XXVII, although he was one of two players declared inactive for Super Bowl Sunday (the other was Robert Williams).

In his NFL career, he played in 86 games.

Retirement and public speaker

Following the Super Bowl XXVII win, Veingrad retired from football in 1993  and returned to Florida. Veingrad speaks professionally to corporations about leadership and professional development.

National Jewish Sports Hall of Fame
Veingrad was inducted into the National Jewish Sports Hall of Fame on April 19, 2010. The ceremony was held at the Suffolk Y Jewish Community Center in Commack, New York. The organization chronicles and celebrates Jewish involvement in sports, and includes Jewish sports legends such as Sandy Koufax, Red Auerbach, Kerri Strug, and Hank Greenberg.

See also
List of select Jewish football players

References

External links
 

1963 births
Living people
American football offensive linemen
Dallas Cowboys players
Green Bay Packers players
Texas A&M–Commerce Lions football players
Sportspeople from Brooklyn
Players of American football from New York City
Players of American football from Fort Lauderdale, Florida
Players of American football from Miami
Players of American football from New York (state)
American Orthodox Jews
Baalei teshuva
Jewish American sportspeople
21st-century American Jews